is a 1,014-capacity live music venue located in Naka-ku, Nagoya, Japan. Since opening in 1992 it has hosted notable artists, such as Green Day, Sheryl Crow, Anthrax, UFO, Night Ranger, Megadeth, Tool, Porcupine Tree, Cheap Trick, Band-Maid and Sonic Youth.

References

Music venues in Japan
1992 establishments in Japan
Buildings and structures in Nagoya
Music venues completed in 1992